Independents Day may refer to:
 Independents Day  (album), an album by Twiztid
 Independent's Day, album by Royce da 5'9"
 Independents' Day, a 2016 science fiction film
Independents Day, a celebration of music independent record labels, a 2008 initiative of the Worldwide Independent Network (see Independent record label#Worldwide Independent Network (WIN))
Independents Day: Awakening The American Spirit, a book by Lou Dobbs

See also
 Independent Days (disambiguation)
 Independence Day (disambiguation)